The Magic Shoes may refer to:
 The Magic Shoes (1935 film)
 The Magic Shoes (1992 film)